Illinois Route 133 is an east–west state highway in east-central Illinois. It runs from Illinois Route 32 in Lovington to U.S. Route 150 and Illinois Route 1 in Paris. Illinois Route 16 terminates with Illinois 133 at this point. Illinois 133 is the main state road through Illinois Amish Country.

Route description  
Illinois 133 is a two-lane undivided surface state highway for its entire length. It overlaps Illinois 16 when both roads terminate at U.S. 150/Illinois 1 in Paris. U.S. 150 runs north and east from this intersection, while Illinois 1 runs north and south. The Illinois 16/133 combination runs west.

History 
SBI Route 133 was the same as Illinois 133 is today, though the eastern portion of the road from Redmon to Paris was not completed until 1942. In 1953 it was extended west to Decatur along Illinois 32; this was rescinded in 1972.

Major Intersections

References

External links

133
Transportation in Douglas County, Illinois
Transportation in Coles County, Illinois
Transportation in Edgar County, Illinois
Transportation in Moultrie County, Illinois